On Tour is a live and studio album by American country singer Ernest Tubb, released in 1962 (see 1962 in music).

Track listing
"The Women Make a Fool Out of Me" (Jimmie Rodgers)
"Go on Home" (Hank Cochran)
"Steel Guitar Rag" (Merle Travis, Cliffie Stone, Leon McAuliffe)
"Old Love, New Tears" (Leon Rhodes, Clay Allen)
"Try Me One More Time" (Ernest Tubb)
"Lover's Waltz" (Rhodes, Allen)
"Drivin' Nails in My Coffin" (Gerald Irby)
"Out of My Mind" (Leon Rhodes, Arvel Bourquin)
"Red Skin Rag" (Bob Kiser, Leon McAuliffe)
"Watching My Past Go By" (Tubb)
"Bandera Waltz" (Ollie Marie Adams)
"In and Out (of Every Heart in Town)" (Hugh Ashley)

Personnel
Ernest Tubb – vocals, guitar
Johnny Johnson – guitar
Leon Rhodes – guitar
Grady Martin – guitar
Buddy Charleton – pedal steel guitar
Jack Drake – bass
Jan Kurtis – drums
Floyd Cramer – piano

References

Albums produced by Owen Bradley
1962 live albums
Ernest Tubb live albums
Decca Records live albums
Decca Records albums